The Daily Grind is an EP by punk rock band No Use for a Name released in 1993. It was the band's first release for Fat Wreck Chords.

Track listing
 "Until It's Gone" – 3:50
 "Old What's His Name" – 2:18
 "Permanent Rust" – 2:31
 "Biomag" – 1:30
 "Countdown" – 3:52
 "Hazardous to Yourself" – 3:05
 "The Daily Grind" – 2:21
 "Feeding the Fire" – 2:27

Band members
Tony Sly - Vocals and Guitar
Rory Koff - Drums
Robin Pfefer - Lead Guitar
Steve Papoutsis - Bass

Credits
Jimbo Phillips - Cover Art

References

No Use for a Name albums
1993 EPs
Fat Wreck Chords EPs